HMS Unsparing (P55) was a Royal Navy U-class submarine built by Vickers-Armstrong.  So far she has been the only ship of the Royal Navy to bear the name Unsparing.

Career
Unsparing spent most of her wartime career in the Mediterranean, where she sank the Italian tanker Flegetonte, the German merchant Ingeborg (the former French Ste. Martine), the German submarine chaser UJ 2106 (the former Greek minelayer Tenedos), the German barge Sybille (the former French Caisson) and the German ferry SF 284, as well as six sailing vessels, including the Greek Evangelistria. She also torpedoed and damaged the German merchant Peter, as well as a number of sailing vessels.

Unsparing survived the war and was scrapped at Thos. W. Ward Inverkeithing in 1946.

References

External links
 IWM Interview with Aston Piper, who commanded HMS Unsparing from 1943 to 1944

 

British U-class submarines
Ships built on the River Tyne
1942 ships
World War II submarines of the United Kingdom
Ships built by Vickers Armstrong